Steven Franklin Parker (born December 8, 1956) is a former American football defensive end who played one season with the New Orleans Saints of the National Football League. He first enrolled at the University of Washington before transferring to North Idaho College and lastly the University of Idaho. He attended Coeur d'Alene High School in Coeur d'Alene, Idaho.

References

External links
Just Sports Stats

Living people
1956 births
Players of American football from Spokane, Washington
American football defensive ends
African-American players of American football
Washington Huskies football players
Idaho Vandals football players
New Orleans Saints players
21st-century African-American people
20th-century African-American sportspeople